Fadhel Abdelkefi, also known as Fadhel Abd Kefi, is a Tunisian financier and politician. He served as the Tunisian Investment Minister until May 1, 2017, when he was appointed as the acting Minister of Finance.

Early life
His father, Ahmed Abdelkefi founded the first leasing company based in Tunisia in 1984. Fadhel was born in 1970. He graduated from the Pantheon-Sorbonne University with a degree in Economics.

Career
Abdelkefi joined his father's company, Tunisie Valeurs, in 1994. By 2005, he was its CEO. By 2013, he was also the head of Integra Partners. He was also the non-executive chairman of the Bourse des valeurs mobilières de Tunis (BVMT).

Abdelkefi was appointed as the Tunisian Investment Minister in November 2016. During his tenure, he encouraged private investment in Tunisia. On May 1, 2017, he succeeded Lamia Zribi as the acting Finance Minister. On 18 August 2017, he resigns acting Finance Minister.

References

Living people
University of Paris alumni
Finance ministers of Tunisia
Tunisian expatriates in France
1970 births